Mukul Balkrishna Wasnik (born 27 September 1959) is an Indian Politician. He was the Minister for Social Justice and Empowerment in Government of India. He represented the Ramtek constituency of Maharashtra from 2009 to 2014. He is a member of the Indian National Congress (INC) political party. He is also a General Secretary of the All India Congress Committee. In 2022, Wasnik was elected member of the Rajya Sabha.

Personal life 
Wasnik was born in a Buddhist family to Veteran Congress leader and three time MP, Balkrishna Ramchandra Wasnik.

Political career
Earlier Wasnik represented Buldhana of Maharashtra during 8th Lok Sabha 1984–1989, 10th Lok Sabha during 1991–1996, and 12th Lok Sabha during 1998–1999. In 1984, Wasnik became the youngest Member of Parliament at age of 25. He has tended to win and lose alternately. From Buldhana - winning in 1984 and losing the next in 1989, winning in 1991 and losing the next in 1996, winning in 1998 and losing in 1999. Then winning from Ramtek in 2009 and losing the next one from there in 2014.

Wasnik was elected as the National President of National Students Union of India during 1984–1986.

Later Wasnik was elected as President of Indian Youth Congress during 1988–1990.

In June 2022, Wasnik was elected to the Rajya Sabha from Rajasthan on Indian National Congress nomination.

Personal life
In March 2020, Mukul Wasnik married his friend Raveena Khurana at the age of 60. In 2008, Wasnik suffered a brain haemorrhage.

References

External links
Lok Sabha Bio

Living people
Indian National Congress politicians
Indian Youth Congress Presidents
People from Maharashtra
India MPs 2009–2014
Members of the Cabinet of India
1959 births
Indian Buddhists
20th-century Buddhists
21st-century Buddhists
Marathi politicians
Union Ministers from Maharashtra
Rashtrasant Tukadoji Maharaj Nagpur University alumni
India MPs 1998–1999
India MPs 1991–1996
India MPs 1984–1989
Lok Sabha members from Maharashtra
People from Buldhana district
People from Nagpur district
Indian National Congress politicians from Maharashtra